Fourteen Words (also abbreviated 14 or 14/88) is a reference to two slogans originated by David Eden Lane, one of nine founding members of the defunct white separatist insurrectionary terrorist organization The Order, and are accompanied by the 88 Precepts. The slogans have served as a rallying cry for militant white nationalists internationally. The primary slogan in the Fourteen Words is "We must secure the existence of our people and a future for white children", followed by the secondary slogan "Because the beauty of the White Aryan woman must not perish from the Earth".

The two slogans were coined prior to Lane serving a 190-year sentence in federal prison for violating the civil rights of the Jewish talk show host Alan Berg, who was murdered by another member of the group in June 1984. They were popularized heavily after Lane's imprisonment. The slogans were publicized through print company 14 Word Press, founded in St. Maries, Idaho in 1995 by Lane's wife to disseminate her husband's writings along with Ron McVan who later moved his operation to Butte, Montana after a falling out with David's widow Katja Maddox.

Lane used the 14-88 numerical coding extensively throughout his spiritual, political, religious, esoteric and philosophical tracts and notably in his 88 Precepts. According to the Southern Poverty Law Center, inspiration for the Fourteen Words "are derived from a passage in Adolf Hitler's autobiographical book Mein Kampf" (a claim Lane never made). The Fourteen Words have been prominently used by neo-Nazis, white power skinheads and certain white nationalists and the alt-right. "88" is used by some as a shorthand for "Heil Hitler", 'H' being the 8th letter of the alphabet, though Lane viewed Nazism as part of the "Zionist conspiracy" along with America.

Lane's ideology was anti-American, white separatist and insurrectionist; he considered loyalty to the United States to be "racial treason" and upheld the acronym "Our Race Is Our Nation" ("ORION"), viewing the United States as committing genocide against white people and as having been founded as a New World Order to finalize a global Zionist government.

Being bitterly opposed to the continued existence of the United States as a political entity, and labeling it the "murderer of the White race", Lane further advocated domestic terrorism as a tool to carve out a "white homeland" in the Northern Mountain States. To that end, Lane issued a declaration called "Moral Authority" published through now-defunct 14 Word Press and shared through the publications of Aryan Nations, World Church of the Creator, and other white separatist groups, referring to the United States as a "Red, White and Blue traveling mass murder machine", while asserting that "true moral authority belongs to those who resist genocide".

Phrasing 
After Lane's publication of the Fourteen Words, they were adopted by white supremacists and neo-Nazis, white nationalists, identitarians, and members of the far-right and alt-right. The most widely used variation is "We must secure the existence of our people and a future for white children"; a less commonly used variation is "Because the beauty of the White Aryan woman must not perish from the earth". They are sometimes combined with the number 88 to form the abbreviations "14/88" or "1488". The 8s represent the eighth letter of the alphabet, H, with "HH" standing for Heil Hitler, according to Neo-Nazis who use the code. The number 88 was used by Lane as a reference to his 88 Precepts, along with a secondary reference to his "88 Lines and 14 Words". "88", when combined with "14", refers to numerology in Lane's white supremacist neo-pagan religion, Wotanism.

The slogan has been used in acts of white supremacist terrorism and violence. It was central to the symbolism of 2008's Barack Obama assassination plot, which intended to kill 88 African Americans, including future president Barack Obama (at that time the Democratic Party nominee), 14 of whom were to be beheaded. Skinhead Curtis Allgier notably tattooed the words on to his body after he murdered corrections officer Stephen Anderson, and Dylann Roof's race war-inspired Charleston church shooting was influenced by the slogan.

Origins 
A strong resemblance between the first definition of the slogan and a statement in Adolf Hitler's Mein Kampf has been pointed out, but it was not pointed out by Lane, nor was it pointed out by Fourteen Word Press. Scholars such as Barry Balleck have stated that Lane was almost certainly influenced by Hitler, specifically, he was influenced by the following statement in Mein Kampf.

According to scholar Mattias Gardell, David Lane decoded something which he termed the "Pyramid Prophecy", which included the concept that the King James Version of the Bible was encoded by Sir Francis Bacon and the concept that David was the "man of prophecy" who is described as the "666 Sun Man" incarnated to "warn and save the White Aryan Race from near extinction" a view that was censored by Ron McVan and others who found the "messianic Antichrist" claims counterproductive.

Gardell's book Gods of the Blood states "The number 1776 appears in the numeric square of Mars in which is found the Star of David and its 741 formula, 741 also being the value of the 14 Words in simple English gematria." Lane claimed that both 14 word slogans came to him whilst he was asleep, and he also claimed that each slogan contained 61 letters, 20 syllables and 74 characters along with the 741 value.

Advocates

United Kingdom 
 Nick Griffin, a British politician, a former British National Party leader and an MEP, has stated that his political ideology can be summed up in the 14 Words. He has claimed "everything I do is related to building a nationalist movement through which [...] those 14 words can be carried out."
 Colin Jordan (1923–2009), a leading figure in post-war neo-Nazism in Great Britain and a longtime supporter of the 14 Words; contributed to Lane's book Deceived, Damned & Defiant.
 Millennial Woes, a Scottish alt-right, neoreactionary political activist and a YouTube personality, supports the slogan and in 2017, he stated that the "14 words used to be more controversial than they are nowadays." Faith Goldy has claimed that he had encouraged her to recite the slogan during an interview.
 John Tyndall (1934–2005) was a British fascist political activist who supported the 14 Words along with his party, the National Front, which he was chairman of from 1972 to 1974.

United States 
 Andrew Anglin, an American white supremacist and the founder of The Daily Stormer website, frequently uses, references, and supports the slogan, and has claimed, "We care not for our own egos or lives. We care only about the agenda, which is: We must secure the existence of our people and a future for white children."
 Baked Alaska, an American alt-right/far-right social media personality, supports the words but he does not support their creator, and he has stated that there's "nothing wrong" with the slogan. Distancing himself from its creator, he claimed, "Just because others have used them doesn't change the meaning." He has frequently promoted the slogan on social media including with monetary receipts, polls, questions and memes.
 Craig Cobb, an American white nationalist and separatist, created the video sharing website Podblanc and started a business which he named after the 14 Words, as well as tried to start a church named after Trump which later burned to the ground.
 Harold Covington (1953–2018), was an American white separatist leader and the founder of the Northwest Front organization, based on the 14 Words.
 Nathan Damigo, an American white supremacist, the leader of Identity Evropa and a former US Marine, supports and promotes the slogan with his organization.
 April Gaede, an American white nationalist and neo-Nazi stage mom, whose daughters (Prussian Blue) used to sing for Resistance Records; distributed David Lane's cremated remains in "14 pyramids" in order to symbolize the 14 Words.
 Matthew Heimbach, an American white supremacist and the founder of the Traditionalist Workers Party, has based a part of his party's platform on the "14 Words" and he has also affirmed them in various speeches, including a speech which he delivered to the Council of Conservative Citizens.
 William Daniel Johnson, an American white nationalist, attorney, and the chairman of the American Freedom Party, is an advocate of the 14 word slogan. He has stated that he and his organization "embrace principles that will secure the existence of our people and a future for our children". He has claimed that Ron Paul withdrew his endorsement of him for a judgeship in California, after media reported that he was an advocate of the 14 Words.
 David Lane (1938–2007), was an American white supremacist leader and he was also a key member of the terrorist organization The Order. He is credited with creating and popularizing the 14 Words. The ADL have described Lane's slogan as reflecting "the primary white supremacist worldview in the late 20th and early 21st centuries".
 Stephen McNallen, an American neo-pagan leader and the founder of the Asatru Folk Assembly, quoted the 14 Words verbatim through National Vanguard magazine declaring: "The mainstream media, the left establishment, and all the usual suspects have declared that this statement is 'racist.' It is not racist, it is not White supremacist, it is not bigoted, it is in no way expressing hostility toward any racial group" and based his own personal slogan "The existence of my people is not negotiable" as a simplified 14 Words.
 Tom Metzger, an American white separatist leader and the founder of White Aryan Resistance, promoted the 14 Word writings of imprisoned David Lane; he accused the United States government of murdering Lane after Lane died in 2007.
 Jack Posobiec, an American alt-right conspiracy theorist and a former naval intelligence officer, has repeatedly published information which is related to "1488" and as a result, he has been described as a supporter of the slogan.
 Billy Roper, an American white supremacist who corresponded with David Lane and founded a White power group which he named "White Revolution" and based on the 14 Words.
 Richard B. Spencer, an American white supremacist and the president of the National Policy Institute, supports the 14-worded slogan.
 Vox Day, an American writer, video game designer, and alt-right activist, supports the 14 Words, promoting the slogan in his Sixteen points of the Alt-Right, which placed the sentence "we must secure the existence of white people and a future for white children" as the 14th point.
 weev, an American computer hacker and an Internet troll, has shown his support for the slogan, referencing "1488" in numerous computer transactions, as well as more explicitly discussing the topic on social media.

Canada 
 Faith Goldy, a Canadian right-wing writer and commentator, has recited and supported the 14 Words, saying "I don't see that as controversial... We want to survive." After being banned by Patreon for her advocacy of the slogan, Goldy defended her views, and gathered petition signatures in public on a document which replaced "white children" with "aboriginal children", to supposedly prove the slogan was not hate speech.

Other nations 
 Marian Kotleba, a Slovak politician and leader of the far-right Kotleba – People's Party Our Slovakia political party, has been accused of demonstrating support for the slogan, with reference to the 14 Words by making a €1,488 donation to three families. The donations were used as an evidence in the court in which he was found guilty of supporting and propagating sympathies towards movements oppressing fundamental human rights and was sentenced to four years and four months in prison. The ruling is not valid yet and may be appealed.

References related to terrorism and violence 

The slogans and the numerology of "14" and "88" have been used by many white supremacists, both before and after they have committed acts of violence (such as in manifestos), as well as in symbols which have been left at the scenes of criminal acts. These include Order-member David Lane, assassination attempters Paul Schlesselman and Daniel Cowart, and murderers Dylann Roof and Curtis Allgier. Allgier has "14" and "88" tattooed on his forehead above and to the sides of the words "skin" and "head" above his eyes in his mugshot.

Murder of Alan Berg 

The assassination of Jewish talk show host Alan Berg in June 1984 is considered as The Order's most infamous act of terrorism. Order member Bruce Pierce served as the gunman in the murder and Lane served as the getaway driver. During Lane's imprisonment on separate convictions (some relating to violating Alan Berg's civil rights) he created the Fourteen Words slogan. The number 14 continues to symbolize allegiance to the Aryan Nations' vision of a white homeland.

Barack Obama assassination plot 

"14/88" numerology was symbolically included in the Barack Obama assassination plot in October 2008. Both Neo-Nazis, Schlesselman and Cowart were introduced to each other online by a mutual friend who shared their white supremacist beliefs. Within a month of meeting, they had planned to kill the Democratic Party nominee by driving at their target and shooting from their vehicle. This was to be followed by a killing spree in which the men planned to kill 88 African Americans, 14 of whom were to be beheaded. They were targeting mostly children at an unidentified, predominantly black school. Shortly after their arrest, their vehicle was discovered to have "14" and "88" written onto it.

Wisconsin Sikh temple shooting 

Mass-shooter Wade Michael Page, who killed six and wounded four members of the Sikh community in August 2012, had been a supporter of the Fourteen Words, and was found with "14" onto a Celtic Cross tattooed on his arm, after committing suicide at the scene of the crime. About a year before the shooting, Page wrote on the Internet regarding the slogan, "Passive submission is indirect support to the oppressors. Stand up for yourself and live the 14 words."

Charleston church shooting 

After the Charleston mass-murder shooting in June 2015, Dylann Roof's ideology and apparent manifesto emerged in the media with multiple references to "1488"; these included several photos of Roof pictured alongside the numbers. He symbolically brought 88 bullets to the Emanuel African Methodist Episcopal Church to carry out the shooting, in which nine African Americans were killed.

Pittsburgh synagogue shooting 

Robert Bowers, the gunman suspected of killing 11 people and wounding 6 at the Tree of Life Synagogue in Pittsburgh, Pennsylvania, included the numeric code "1488" in the header image of his Gab social media account. Bowers also expressed Christian Identity rhetoric declaring "the lord jesus christ is come in the flesh" while espousing anti-Semitic views that "jews are children of satan".

Christchurch mosque shootings 

Brenton Harrison Tarrant, the shooter responsible for the attacks, posted images on Twitter of firearms and published his manifesto "The Great Replacement" which both had the neo-Nazi symbol Black Sun and the slogan (as "14" or "14 Words") written on the weapons and also in the manifesto. The firearms were used in the shooting.

See also 

 Antisemitic canard
 Fort Smith sedition trial
 Great Replacement
 Kalergi Plan
 List of conspiracy theories § Antisemitism
 List of symbols designated by the Anti-Defamation League as hate symbols
 Northwest Territorial Imperative
 White ethnostate
 White genocide conspiracy theory
 White Lives Matter
 Zionist Occupation Government conspiracy theory

References 

 

1990s neologisms
Alt-right
Neo-fascism
Neo-Nazi concepts
Slogans
White genocide conspiracy theory
White nationalist symbols